Derary  is a rural commune of the Cercle of Djenné in the Mopti Region of Mali. The commune contains eight villages. The administrative center (chef-lieu) is the village of Gagna. In the 2009 census the commune had a population of 6,558.

References

Communes of Mopti Region